The BCW Can-Am Heavyweight Championship is the top title contested for in the Ontario-based professional wrestling promotion Border City Wrestling.

On March 18, 2010 the BCW Can-Am Championship was unified with the BSE Pro and Neo Spirit Pro-Wrestling Championships to form the Maximum Pro Wrestling Triple Crown Championship.

On August 24, 2012 the Can-Am Championship was splintered from the Triple Crown with its defense on the debut event of BCW off-shoot promotion Can-Am Rising. Since then the title has been referred to it original title name the BCW Can-Am Heavyweight Championship, predominantly defending under the BCW banner .

Title history
BCW Can-Am Heavyweight Championship

Combined reigns

See also

Professional wrestling in Canada

References

General

Border City Wrestling championships
Heavyweight wrestling championships
International professional wrestling championships
North American professional wrestling championships